Armisa Kuč (born 11 April 1992) is a Montenegrin footballer, who plays as a forward in the Turkish Women's Super League for >Ankara BB Fomget and the Montenegro women's national team.

Club career 
Kuč played in her country's Women's League for ŽFK Ekonomist. She then was with the Bosnian-Herzegovinian club SFK 2000 in the Premier League. In 2017, she went to Sweden and ğlayed for the Borlänge-based club  Kvarnsvedens in the Elitettan. The next year, she moved to Spain to join Zaragoza, and then Málaga. Kuč transferred to FC Minsk in Belarus.

By January 2023, she moved to Turkey, and signed with >Ankara BB Fomget to play in the second half of the 2022–23 Super League season.

International career 
Her debut for the Montenegro women's national team came on 13 March 2012, in a 2–3 friendly match loss against Bosnia and Herzegovina in Bar, Montenegro. She was present in all the games played by the Montenegro national team from its inception until September 2021, that means 56 consecutive games where she scored 20 goals.

International goals

Honours

Club 
Ekonomist 
Montenegrin Women's League: 2012–13

SFK 2000
Bosnian Women's Premier League: 2014–15, 2015–16
Bosnian Women's Cup: 2014–15, 2015–16

References

External links 
Armisa Kuč at BDFútbol

1992 births
Living people
Montenegrin women's footballers
Women's association football forwards
ŽFK Ekonomist players
Montenegro women's international footballers
Expatriate women's footballers in Bosnia and Herzegovina
Montenegrin expatriate sportspeople in Sweden
Expatriate women's footballers in Sweden
Kvarnsvedens IK players
Montenegrin expatriate sportspeople in Spain
Expatriate women's footballers in Spain
Primera División (women) players
Zaragoza CFF players
Málaga CF Femenino players
Montenegrin expatriate sportspeople in Belarus
Expatriate women's footballers in Belarus
Montenegrin expatriate sportspeople in Turkey
Expatriate women's footballers in Turkey
Turkish Women's Football Super League players
Fomget Gençlik ve Spor players